Percy Pepoon (November 11, 1861 - September 7, 1939) was an American politician who served in the Missouri Senate.  He previously served as mayor of Hardy, Arkansas.  Pepoon purchased the Hardy Herald newspaper in 1903.

References

1861 births
1939 deaths
Democratic Party Missouri state senators
People from Warren, Illinois